The Bombardier Flexity Classic is a model of light-rail tram manufactured by Bombardier Transportation (now merged into Alstom). Although it is marketed as the most traditionally designed member of the Flexity family, it is still a modern bi-directional articulated tram with a low-floor section allowing good accessibility, especially to passengers in wheelchairs.

Flexity models operate in a number of German cities, as well as in Stockholm (2010–2020), Norrköping and Gothenburg (Sweden), Kraków and Gdańsk (Poland), and Adelaide in South Australia.

Along with Bombardier's other Flexity trams, the Flexity Classic's closest competitors are Alstom's Citadis and Siemens' Combino, Avenio and Avanto.

Adelaide 

In 2006 TransAdelaide began to replace the Type H cars operating on the Glenelg tram line with 11 Flexity Classic trams built in Bautzen, Germany by Bombardier Transportation. The first of the new cars was delivered to the Glengowrie depot in November 2005 and entered revenue service on 9 January 2006. A further order of four in 2008 brought the total to 15, numbered 101–115.

The Flexity cars are painted in a standard Adelaide Metro colour scheme of white with yellow, blue and red ends. The trams have low floors throughout 70 per cent of their length, and are accessible to pushchairs and wheelchairs through each of the three sets of doors. Their features include air conditioning, heating, recorded video surveillance and automated audio and visual announcements of the next stop. Roving conductors are employed.

The internal layout accommodates 64 seated passengers and another 115 standing. Initial overcrowding owing to the popularity of the rejuvenated Glenelg line and the short route extension through the business area of Adelaide, and the inadequacy of air conditioning in Adelaide's hot summers, led to adverse reactions from commuters and local media, but the faults were soon rectified and supplementation by Alstom Citadis trams (200 Series) has minimised overcrowding.

Specifications

Dresden and Leipzig 

The Flexity Classic XXL model was developed for the Dresden Transport Authority by the German factory Bombardier Transportation in Bautzen.
The tram has been in service since 2003 and serves tram lines with a high peak load of passengers. The exterior is specially designed for the Dresden Transport Authority, which owns 43 trams.

The Flexity Classic XXL is also in service in Leipzig, Germany (classification NGT12-LEI) with the Leipzig Transport Authority (LVB). Although the exterior design is customized, the tram offers the same capacity. It has been in service since 2005. The LVB first ordered 12 trams of this type, then exercised an option for another 12 trams in September 2005 and a third (slightly changed) batch of 9 was delivered in late 2011/early 2012.

Around the world

References

External links 
Flexity official site

Bombardier Transportation tram vehicles
Tram vehicles of Australia
Tram vehicles of Germany
Tram vehicles of Poland
Tram vehicles of Sweden
Articulated passenger trains